Norgestomet, or norgestamet, sold under the brand name Syncro-Mate B and Crestar, is a progestin medication which is used in veterinary medicine to control estrus and ovulation in cattle.

Uses

Veterinary
Norgestomet is used in veterinary medicine.

Pharmacology

Pharmacodynamics
Norgestomet is a progestogen. In addition to the progesterone receptor, it possesses weak (micromolar) affinity for the glucocorticoid receptor.

Chemistry

Norgestomet, also known as 11β-methyl-17α-acetoxy-19-norprogesterone or as 17α-hydroxy-11β-methyl-19-norpregn-4-ene-3,20-dione acetate, is a synthetic norpregnane steroid and a derivative of progesterone.

History
Norgestomet was developed and introduced for veterinary use in the mid-1970s.

Society and culture

Generic names
It also known as norgestamet and is known by its developmental code name SC-21009.

Brand names
Norgestomet is marketed under the brand names Syncro-Mate B and Crestar.

References

Acetate esters
Diketones
Glucocorticoids
Norpregnanes
Progestogen esters
Progestogens
Veterinary drugs